Based in the United States and founded in 2001, HelioPower develops proprietary projects with third-party offtakers and currently owns and operates more than 100 energy systems at facilities such as the Tech Museum of Innovation in San Jose and Ronald McDonald House in San Diego.

Products and Services 
HelioPower operates 6 business lines:
 Residential solar
 Energy analytics
 Engineering, procurement and construction (EPC) for distributed energy projects and facility improvements
 Energy project finance and advisory services
 Energy asset management including Operations & Maintenance (O&M) services
 PredictEnergy™, an energy analytics software platform

Residential Solar 
HelioPower was a top 10 installer in California in 2013 having installed over 4,000 residential solar voltaic PV systems in California and Nevada. They offer direct-to-customer or direct-to-partner services. Direct-to-customer services include complimentary energy audits, energy efficiency upgrades, and solar systems.  HelioPower offers numerous residential financing options including leases and power purchase agreements, utility rebate programs, PACE financing programs including the HERO program, and State and Federal energy incentives.

Direct-to-partner services include full EPC offerings as well as third-party financing for qualified partners.

Energy Analytics 
Energy analytics synthesizes three distinct but inter-related pieces of information: (1) How much energy and power a business uses, and when and where it’s used; (2) what a business makes, moves or stores; where it performs this work, when it performs this work, and how this work changes and scales; and, (3) what a business pays, and how it procures, energy and power. HelioPower provides energy analytics consulting services to the water/waste-water, manufacturing and distribution industries.

Engineering, Procurement, & Construction (EPC) 
HelioPower offers turnkey EPC solutions including solar PV, energy storage and facility improvement measures as well as systems integration solutions including CHP and bio-mass. HelioPower also decouples its EPC capabilities and offers discrete engineering, procurement and construction services to end users and industry partners. HelioPower has performed engineering and construction management services throughout the US and worldwide.

HelioPower operates with a structured project planning and control (PP&C) methodology based on PMI's (the Project Management Institute) PMBOK.

Energy Project Finance & Advisory Services 
HelioPower raises and syndicates project finance for proprietary and third-party energy projects and provides financing options for all its customer segments. Offerings include power purchase agreements (PPA), leases, and/or subsidized energy loans.  All financing products are structured to lower the overall cost of energy and significantly reduce or eliminate the upfront cost of purchasing an energy system. HelioPower also offers energy finance advisory services for avoided cost analyses, project modeling, project placement, and best fit analyses.

Asset Management Including Operations & Maintenance (O&M) 
In addition to distributed generation asset management, HelioPower provides operations and maintenance services specifically for solar assets, battery backup systems, off-grid systems and solar manufacturer warranty and after-market support. HelioPower’s asset management capabilities grew out of its proprietary portfolio of distributed generation assets. HelioPower currently manages over 20 megawatts of commercial and industrial sector solar assets.

PredictEnergy Energy Analytics Software 
Predict Energy is a cloud-based commercial and industrial energy analytics software platform that tracks, analyzes and predicts energy cost and energy intensity based on three dimensions:
 Energy Intensity - energy and power by date, time and location
 Business performance - production, distribution or processing volume by date, time and location
 Cost structure - electric utility tariff, distributed generation, work rules and demand response impact

The PredictEnergy software platform is specifically designed to address energy intensity in the manufacturing, distribution, and water/waste-water industries.

Locations 
HelioPower, Inc. was founded in Fallbrook, California. Since 2007, HelioPower has been headquartered in Murrieta, California. HelioPower has the following additional locations: San Diego County, San Francisco, Concord, and Coachella Valley, California, as well as Incline Village, Nevada. This strategic coverage allows HelioPower the ability to service residential and commercial customers in California statewide.

Helio Micro Utility and Acquisition of Greenzu, Inc. 
In 2007 HelioPower spun out Helio Micro-Utility in order to provide specialized project finance services to energy investors, financial institutions, and end-users
In 2008, Helio Micro-Utility developed the Helio Green Energy Fund with CitiBank for non-profit corporations and affordable housing communities.
On August 20, 2013 HelioPower officially acquired Greenzu, Inc., a national provider of solar finance solutions for commercial and non-profit customers. 
The acquisition expanded HelioPower's suite of energy financing products.

Solar Water Funding Alliance 
On May 28, 2014, HelioPower partnered with Panasonic Eco Solutions North America (Panasonic) and its strategic partner Coronal Group to create the Solar Water Funding Alliance, a multi-million-dollar effort focused solely on developing, building, financing and managing solar PV installations for California's water agencies. Recognizing the urgent need among water agencies to reduce expenses, this alliance enables these agencies to save significantly on their electric bill by converting to photovoltaic solar energy with zero upfront costs. As a result, water agencies are able to transfer the money they were paying the electric companies back into water projects to help their own ratepayers.

See also
Efficient energy use
Index of solar energy articles
List of energy storage projects
Outline of energy
Solar power
Solar power in California

References 

Wikipedia's Project Energy

Solar energy companies of the United States
Solar energy in California
Energy companies established in 2001
Renewable resource companies established in 2001
2001 establishments in California
Companies based in Riverside County, California
Companies based in Contra Costa County, California
American companies established in 2001